Duy is the EP by Azerbaijani singer Aygun Kazimova released 7 September 2018 by SS Production. The album was recorded in Georgia in 2018, most of tracks were produced by Georgian musician Kakhaber Tsiskaridze. It also contains remake version of single "S.U.S." which was released in 2017 and cover version of famous children song called "Cücələrim". Non remixed version of "Duy" was released in 2019 as single.

Track listing

References 

2018 EPs